Davidson Sylvester Hector Willoughby Nicol  or pen named Abioseh Nicol (14 September 1924 – 20 September 1994) was a Sierra Leone Creole academic, diplomat, physician, writer and poet. He was able to secure degrees in the arts, science and commercial disciplines and he contributed to science, history, and literature. Nicol was the first African to graduate with first class honours from the University of Cambridge and he was also the first African elected as a fellow of a college of Cambridge University. Davidson Nicol also contributed to medical science when he was the first to analyse the breakdown of insulin in the human body, a discovery which was a breakthrough for the treatment of diabetes.

Early life
Nicol was born as Davidson Sylvester Hector Willoughby Nicol on 14 September 1924 in Bathurst, Sierra Leone, to Jonothan Josibiah Nicol. He taught at the Prince of Wales School in Freetown, the capital city of Sierra Leone, and studied on a scholarship at Christ's College, Cambridge University in the United Kingdom, graduating with a BA in natural science in 1947. He was the first black African to graduate with first-class honours.  He got a medical degree from London Hospital Medical College. On 11 August 1950, he was married to Marjorie Johnston of Trinidad. Nicol had five children.

In the early 1950s, he taught at the Ibadan University medical school, researching topical malnutrition, before returning to Cambridge in 1954. In 1957, he was named the first black African Fellow of a Christ's College, and went to the college to research insulin under famed scientist Frederick Sanger. He published two works on the topic, The Mechanism of Action of Insulin and The Structure of Human Insulin. both in 1960. He had returned to Freetown in 1958, and was working for the Sierra Leonean government as a pathologist.

Academia

Beginning in 1960, Nicol was the first native principal of Fourah Bay College in Freetown for eight years. While principal of the college, he led a large expansion program. Nicol was a member Public Service Commission until 1968. Nicol continued his administrative career at the university level in Sierra Leone as first the chairman (1964–68) then as Vice-Chancellor at the University of Sierra Leone (1966–68). In 1964, he was appointed a CMG.

Diplomacy
Nicol left academia in 1968 to become the Permanent Representative of Sierra Leone to the United Nations, which he served as until 1971. In that year, Nicol became the High Commissioner to the United Kingdom, which ended in 1972. In 1972, Nicol became the Under-Secretary-General of the United Nations under Austrian Kurt Waldheim, which he served as until 1982. While serving as Under-Secretary General, Nicol also served as head of the United Nations Institute for Training and Research (UNITAR). He was also at one point ambassador of Sierra Leone to Norway, Sweden, and Denmark. He was President of the United Nations Security Council in September 1970.

Return to academia and retirement
He maintained a home for many years in Thornton Road, Cambridge, England, frequently visiting Christ's College, of which he had been made a distinguished Honorary Fellow, meanwhile serving from 1987 until retiring in 1991 as a visiting professor of International Studies at the University of California (1987–88) and University of South Carolina (1990–91). Nicol retired in 1991 at the age of 67 to Cambridge, where he died three years later at the age of 70. He was president of the World Federation of United Nations Associations from 1983 to 1987.

Nicol's writings
Beginning in 1965 with Two African Tales, Nicol was a published author of short stories, as well as poetry, music, academic literature and a biography of Africanus Horton, an early Sierra Leonean author and one of the founders of African Nationalism. His last piece of published work was Creative Women in 1982.

Selected bibliography
 Africa, A Subjective View, 1964 
 Two African Tales, 1965
 The Truly Married Woman, and Other Stories, 1965
 Creative Women, 1982

Sources
 Abioseh Nicol on the Literary Encyclopedia
The Papers of Davidson Nicol held at Churchill Archives Centre

References

1924 births
1994 deaths
Sierra Leonean diplomats
Sierra Leonean physicians
Fellows of Christ's College, Cambridge
Sierra Leonean male poets
Sierra Leone Creole people
People from Freetown
High Commissioners of Sierra Leone to the United Kingdom
Permanent Representatives of Sierra Leone to the United Nations
Alumni of Christ's College, Cambridge
Alumni of Queen Mary University of London
Alumni of the Medical College of St Bartholomew's Hospital
20th-century Sierra Leonean poets
20th-century male writers
Academic staff of Fourah Bay College
Sierra Leonean expatriates in Nigeria
Academic staff of the University of Ibadan